Smule is an American mobile app developer with headquarters in San Francisco. The company specializes in developing social music-making and collaboration applications for iOS, Android, and Web.

The company was founded in 2008 by Jeff Smith and Stanford assistant professor Ge Wang. "Music was the original social network before Instagram and Facebook," said Smith, the co-founder and CEO of Smule. Wang commented that the goal of the apps was to draw users in and "by the time they realize they're making music, 'it's too late — they're already having fun.'" In December 2011, Smule acquired fellow music app developer Khush.  On July 31, 2013, Wang stepped down from his role at Smule to return to Stanford full-time. Smule currently . Smule has raised $156.5 million to date, with Tencent leading their latest fundraising round. "We wanted to bring music back to its social roots," Smith said. "With mobile phones we make people more expressive and can we connect them to make them social together." The company raised $74 million in funding in 2018 from Tencent and Times Bridge, the VC wing of India media conglomerate The Times Group.

Apps developed

References

External links
https://www.cnet.com/news/smule-is-the-biggest-music-app-you-never-heard-of/

Companies based in Palo Alto, California
Companies based in San Francisco
Video game companies established in 2008
Video game companies of the United States
Video game publishers
Video game development companies
Privately held companies based in California
2008 establishments in California